Mercaptobenzimidazole is the organosulfur compound with the formula C6H4(NH)2C=S.  It is the mercaptan of benzimidazole.  It is a white solid that has been investigated as a corrosion inhibitor. The name is a misnomer because the compound is a thiourea, characterized with a short C=S bond length of 169 pm. A similar situation applies to 2-mercaptoimidazole, which is also a thiourea properly called 2-imidazolidinethione and mercaptobenzothiazole, which is also a thioamide.

References

Thioureas
Nitrogen heterocycles
Heterocyclic compounds with 2 rings